Rozogi  is a village in Szczytno County, Warmian-Masurian Voivodeship, in north-eastern Poland. It is the seat of the gmina (administrative district) called Gmina Rozogi. It is located in the historic region of Masuria.

The village has a population of 1,418.

History
The village was founded in 1448, although there are traces of earlier human settlement near the village, a former pagan cemetery. In 1811 amber deposits were discovered there. In the late 19th century, the village had an exclusively Polish population of 2,171, mostly living off farming and smuggling cloth, tobacco and vodka to the nearby Russian Partition of Poland. There were three distilleries and two brickyards near the village.

References

Villages in Szczytno County
1448 establishments in Europe
Populated places established in the 1440s